Caucasian campaign of Pompey was a military campaign led by Pompey that took place in 65 BC and was a consequence of the third Mithridatic War fought over Georgian lands and its neighboring frontiers. Rome sought to expand its influence and establish itself as the overlord of the Middle East. After conquering the Kingdom of Pontus and receiving the subjugation of Tigranes II of Armenia the Romans marched on the Kingdom of Iberia, whose king, Artoces had been an ally of Mithridates VI of Pontus, Rome's premier enemy during the 80's, 70's and early 60's BC.

Background
The Roman General Lucullus had led the eastern campaign from 73 BC to 67 BC but after a mutiny of his army he had retreated to Galatia in Asia Minor. In 66 BC, the Roman Senate gave command of the war against Mithridates to Gnaeus Pompeius (better known as Pompey). That same year Pompey effectively defeated Mithridates at the Battle of the Lycus, with the king escaping through Colchis to the Bosporean kingdom north of the Black Sea. A pursuit party was sent after him, they followed him all the way to Colchis but lost his trail. Pompey meanwhile prepared to advance into Armenia against his second enemy, Tigranes II the Great king of the Armenian empire. When he did Tigranes submitted and was allowed to keep Armenia, but not those lands he had won by conquest (parts of Cappadocia, Cilicia, Syria, Phoenicia and Sophene). Pompey left Armenia under the military supervision of Afranius, he sent Gabinius south-east towards Mesopotamia and he himself marched the main army north (into the valley of the river Cyrnus) towards the Kingdom of Albania. Here he split his troops into three divisions and put them into winterquarters.

First campaign
The Caucasian Albani decided to act before the Romans could invade. Oroeses, king of the Albani, organized a concerted attack on the divided Roman forces. The attacks were to coincide with the Roman feast of Saturnalia to maximize their success. Unfortunately, the capably led veteran Roman forces were more than a match for the Albani tribesmen and their attacks were easily repulsed. Oroeses was forced to submit to terms. Pompey then made preparations for the subjugation of both the Albanian and Iberian kingdoms. Fearing imminent invasion Artoces (probably the Artag of Georgian history) king of the Iberians turned to diplomacy and promised the Romans unconditional friendship. Pompey accepted the terms but because he was alerted by his intelligence service that the Iberians were secretly planning an attack, in the spring of 65 BC he marched his forces into Iberia. Artoces, who was still preparing for his surprise attack on the Romans, was caught off guard. 

Pompey's forces quickly captured the pass into Iberia and seized the fortress of Harmozike. Artoces panicked and fled, he took shelter on the left bank of Kura river. He burned the bridge to ensure that the Romans could not cross the river. Pompey subjugated the right bank. Artoces requested a truce promising the Romans that he would restore the bridge and supply them with food. Artoces stayed true to his words but upon restoring the bridge, Pompey crossed it with his forces in an attempt to seize the king. 

Artoces withdrew to the Aragvi River and burned a bridge in the same manner. Some of the Iberian militants hid in the woods and fought the Roman forces like partisans, shooting down arrows from the trees, killing any passing Roman soldiers. Reportedly, a sizeable number of women also participated in this irregular warfare. They were defeated when Pompey's forces cut down some of the forest and then burned the rest to the ground.

Pompey pursued Artoces into the centre of Iberia and brought him to battle near the river Pelorus. Artoces main strength lay in his archers, but, using tactics reminiscent of the Athenians at the Battle of Marathon, Pompey disabled them by means of a rapid infantry charge, which brought his legionaries to close quarters before the enemy fire could take effect. Greek historian Plutarch called this battle a great battle and noted that Iberian casualties consisted of approximately 9,000 people, while more than 10,000 were taken captive by the Romans. 

The Iberians finally lost the war, and their king was forced to turn to diplomacy once more. He sent invaluable objects made of gold to Pompey and asked for a truce. Pompey demanded Artoces's children as hostages and, as the king was taking too much time to think it over, led his soldiers to Aragvi and crossed it so that he left Artoces no choice. He submitted, gave his children as hostages and signed the peace with the Romans. The Kingdom of Iberia was to be a friend and ally of the Roman Republic and accepted the terms of vassalage.

Second campaign
After subduing Iberia, Pompey headed towards the small kingdom of Colchis and subjugated its main stronghold and various local peoples on the way through both cunning diplomacy and the use of force. He met up with the admiral Servilius and his fleet in Phasis and commanded them to blockade Mithridates who was still in his Bosporean kingdom, while he returned to Albania to quell a revolt. Pompey gave the rule of Colchis to Aristarches, effectively making it a Roman province, part of Bithynia et Pontus.

Pompey's line of march took him south of Iberia, where he no doubt feared serious hindrance from the inhabitants and a shortage of supplies due to the foraging of the previous campaign, and involved a hazardous crossing of the Cyrnus into Albania. Here he used his horses and pack animals as a sort of breakwater to shield his infantry from the full force of the current. The crossing was followed by a long march through rugged desert terrain in pursuit of the Albanian army, a march made all the more difficult by unreliable guides and the fact that many of his soldiers fell ill after drinking too deeply of the chilly waters of the river Cambyses. This led Pompey to take more care over the provision of water and for the next stage of march 10,000 water skins were procured and used.

The Albani were finally caught at the river Abas where a decisive battle was fought. Plutarch, supported by Strabo, gives their numbers at 60,000 foot and 12,000 horse, but this must be an exaggeration, since Dio says that Pompey was at pains to disguise his own numerical superiority in order to induce Oroeses to attack. He achieved this by placing his cavalry in front of his infantry and instructed his legionaries to keep out of sight by kneeling and covering up their helmets. It worked, the Albani thought they were just facing his cavalry and charged. The infantry rose, the Roman horse retreated through the infantry lines and then the legionaries broke the Albani charge. The trap was closed by the cavalry which had wheeled left and right, rode around the back of their own lines, and came round to attack the Albani in the rear. The Albani were decisively defeated.  

The victory finally put an end to any threat of armed resistance in the north-east. Many of the tribes of the Causasus and Caspian sent envoys to conclude peace with Rome.

References

 Georgian Soviet Encyclopedia, Vol. 8, pg. 156-157, Tb., 1984
 Appian - History of the Mithridatic Wars
 John Leach, Pompey the Great, chapter 4, Conqueror of the East. 

60s BC conflicts
Wars involving the Roman Republic
65 BC
Invasions of Georgia (country)